Lyriothemis defonsekai is a species of dragonfly in the family Libellulidae. It is endemic to Sri Lanka.

References

Sources
 defonsekai.html World Dragonflies
 Animal diversity web
 All Odonates
 Sri Lanka Biodiversity

See also 
 List of odonates of Sri Lanka

Libellulidae
Insects described in 2009